H. R. Nagendra is an Indian mechanical engineer, Yoga therapist, academic, writer and the founder vice chancellor of Swami Vivekananda Yoga Anusandhana Samsthana (S-VYASA), a deemed university located in Bengaluru. He is best known as the personal yoga consultant of Narendra Modi, the prime minister of India and is a recipient of Yoga Shri title from the Ministry of Health and Family Welfare. He has authored 35 books and over 100 research papers on Yoga. The Government of India awarded him the fourth highest civilian honour of the Padma Shri, in 2016, for his contributions to society.

Biography 
H. R. Nagendra, born on New Year's Day 1943 in the south Indian state of Karnataka, graduated in mechanical engineering and continued his studies to secure a doctoral degree (PhD) from the Indian Institute of Science (IISc), Bengaluru. He started his career by joining IISc as a member of faculty of mechanical engineering in 1968 and held the post till 1975. In between, he served as a post-doctoral fellow at the University of British Columbia in 1970 followed by a stint at Marshall Space Flight Center of NASA during 1970–71. During his stay in the US, he was also associated with Harvard University as a consultant at their Engineering Sciences Laboratory from 1970 to 1972 after which he moved to London and worked as a visiting faculty at Imperial College of Science and Technology. Returning to India, he resumed his career at IISc which would stretch for two more years till he started his association in 1975 with Vivekananda Kendra, a spiritual organization founded in 1972 by Eknath Ranade, by taking up the post of the honorary director of the training centre at the organization's headquarters in Kanyakumari.

For the next quarter of a century, Nagendra was involved with organizational and operational activities of Vivekananda Kendra. He became the national secretary of Yoga Shiksha Vibhag, the yoga education centre of the organization in 1975 and held the post till he was elected as the national vice president of the organization in 1993. In between, he also held the post of the Secretary of Vivekananda Kendra Yoga Therapy and Research Committee from 1979 to 1986 and the post of the Secretary of Vivekananda Kendra Yoga Research Foundation and the Director of Indian Yoga Institute from 1986 to 2000. In 2000, he became the president of Vivekananda Yoga Anusandhana Samsthana, which was started as a society in 2000, and when the society started its academic programs in 2002, he became its founder vice chancellor. The university was subsequently recognized by the University Grants Commission as a deemed university. He served as the vice chancellor of the university till 2013 when  Ramachandra G. Bhat took over the position but continues his association with the university as its chancellor. He has also served as a member of the working group on health of the erstwhile Planning Commission of India.

Awards and honors 
The Ministry of Health and Family Welfare awarded him the title of Yoga Shri in 1997. The Government of India included in the Republic Day honors list for the civilian award of the Padma Shri in 2016.

Legacy 
Nagendra is reported to be the pioneer of Cyclic meditation, a yoga technique where the practitioners perform slow conscious physical movements. He claims the technique is useful in treating certain psychiatric illnesses, asthma and cancer and helps the practitioner in stress management.  It was during his tenure as the vice chancellor, Prashanti Kuteeram, the present headquarters of the university was constructed in Bengaluru. He chaired the organizing committee of the International Yoga Day functions held in New York on 21 June 2015 where two world records were set; a yoga class featuring 35,985 people, and the largest number of participating nationalities (84 nations). He has published 35 books and over 110 articles on Yoga, besides publishing 30 research papers in engineering and mentoring 20 doctoral students.

Selected bibliography

Books

Articles

References

External links

Further reading 
 

Recipients of the Padma Shri in other fields
1943 births
Indian yoga teachers
Scholars from Karnataka
Educators from Karnataka
Heads of universities and colleges in India
Indian Institute of Science alumni
Academic staff of the Indian Institute of Science
University of British Columbia alumni
Harvard University faculty
NASA people
Marshall Space Flight Center
Indian mechanical engineers
Living people
20th-century Indian engineers
Indian medical writers
Engineers from Karnataka
Recipients of the Rajyotsava Award 2010
Yoga therapists